The 1997 Dubai Tennis Championships was a men's tennis tournament played on outdoor hard courts at the Aviation Club Tennis Centre in Dubai in the United Arab Emirates and was part of the World Series of the 1997 ATP Tour. The tournament ran from 10 February through 16 February 1997. Second-seeded Thomas Muster won the singles title.

Finals

Singles

 Thomas Muster defeated  Goran Ivanišević 7–5, 7–6(7–3)
 It was Muster's 1st title of the year and the 44th of his career.

Doubles

 Sander Groen /  Goran Ivanišević defeated  Sandon Stolle /  Cyril Suk 7–6, 6–3
 It was Groen's only title of the year and the 1st of his career. It was Ivanišević's 3rd title of the year and the 27th of his career.

References

External links
 Official website
 ATP tournament profile

 
Dubai Tennis Championships
Dubai Tennis Championships